Simone Dell'Acqua (born 22 November 1989) is an Italian footballer.

He mostly spent his career at Lombardy region (2004–2013) and Italian Lega Pro divisions (the third and fourth division, from 2007 to 2014).

Biography
Born in Milan, capital of the Lombardy region, Dell'Acqua joined Internazionale's Allievi Regionali team (U16; B team of under-17 age group) in 2004. He scored two league goals in 2004–05 season. In the next season he was promoted to Allievi Nazionali team and also scored twice. He left for Legnano's Berretti U-20 team in 2006. In July 2007 the deal became permanent. He only played five Serie C1 games in 2007–08 season. In 2008–09 season at first he played for Solbiatese but returned to Legnano in January 2009.

Legnano was expelled from the professional league by the Commissione di Vigilanza sulle Società di Calcio Professionistiche (Co.Vi.So.C.) of FIGC as the club failed to pass certain financial and bureaucratic criteria in 2010. Dell'Acqua then left for Pro Patria and made his debut in November.

On 13 July 2011 he was signed by FeralpiSalò, rejoining former Inter team-mate Paolo Branduani.

In January 2012 he left for Lecco. On 31 July 2012 he was released by FeralpiSalò.

References

External links
 Football.it Profile 

Italian footballers
Inter Milan players
A.C. Legnano players
Aurora Pro Patria 1919 players
FeralpiSalò players
Calcio Lecco 1912 players
Santarcangelo Calcio players
Association football wingers
Footballers from Milan
1989 births
Living people